Down the Shore is an American sitcom television series created by Alan Kirschenbaum, which aired on Fox from June 21, 1992 to May 27, 1993.

Synopsis
The series revolves around three childhood friends, Aldo, Zack, and Eddie. In hopes of meeting women at the Jersey Shore over the summer, they decided to get a beach house in Belmar, New Jersey. To cover expenses, they share the beach house with three female co-workers, Donna, Miranda, and Arden. At the start of the second season, Miranda was written out of the series by having a job that was too demanding, and the new female occupant of the beach house was a woman named Sammy, whom Aldo once had a fling with.

Although the show was largely comedic in nature, it did have one notable episode where Aldo, a noted Lothario, had been briefly hospitalized and was awaiting the result of an AIDS test. This made all the renters of the beach home, while supportive of Aldo awaiting the results, mull over the fact that casual sex can come with an expensive price.

The show ran for 29 episodes over two seasons. The first episode aired Sunday at 9:30 pm and the rest of the first season aired at 10:00 pm. The second season aired Sunday at 10:30 pm for the first two episodes and Thursday at 9:30 pm for the remaining episodes.

Cast
 Louis Mandylor as Aldo Carbone
 Cathryn de Prume as Donna Shipko
 Anna Gunn as Arden
 Tom McGowan as Eddie Cheever
 Lew Schneider as Zack Singer
 Nancy Sorel as Sammy (15 episodes, 1992–1993)
 Pamela Adlon as Miranda Halpern (13 episodes, 1992)

Episodes

Season 1 (1992)

Season 2 (1992–93)

External links

1990s American sitcoms
1992 American television series debuts
1993 American television series endings
English-language television shows
Fox Broadcasting Company original programming
Television shows set in New Jersey
Television series by 3 Arts Entertainment
Television series by HBO Independent Productions